Quambatook  is a town in northern Victoria, Australia.

Description and history

Quambatook is located on the Avoca River in the Shire of Gannawarra local government area,  from the state capital, Melbourne. The primary school closed in mid 2017 after no applications to teach the six remaining students were received.

Quambatook was settled following the end of the Victorian gold rush of the 1850s.  Resumption of large squatter's land holdings for closer settlement in the 1870s led to Quambatook becoming one of Victoria's leading wheat and sheep producing areas. Quambatook Post Office opened on 1 September 1879.

Quambatook has been recognised as the tractor pulling capital of Australia with an annual competition, the Australian Tractor Pulling Championships, held at Easter since 1976.  In fact, the town's motto is 'Land of wheat and wool, home of the tractor pull'. 
The town is where country music performer John Williamson grew up. Williamson has written a musical named for the town.

Golfers play at the course of the Quambatook Golf Club on Boort Road.

After over a century of history, Quambatook Football Club folded from the Golden Rivers Football League following the 2022 season.

Gallery

See also
 Quambatook (musical)

References

External links

Towns in Victoria (Australia)